Amber English (born October 25, 1989 in Colorado Springs, Colorado) is an American sport shooter who won the gold medal in the women's skeet at the 2020 Olympic Games in Tokyo, Japan, setting a new Olympic record of 56. Amber English is currently serving as a First lieutenant in the United States Army.

Early life
Born to a family of hunters and sport shooters, English began shooting at age 6. She later attended the University of Colorado Colorado Springs.

Career
She participated at the 2018 ISSF World Shooting Championships, winning two medals including a gold medal in the skeet team event.

Gallery

References

External links

Living people
1989 births
American female sport shooters
American military Olympians
Medalists at the 2020 Summer Olympics
Olympic gold medalists for the United States in shooting
Skeet shooters
Sportspeople from Colorado Springs, Colorado
Shooters at the 2020 Summer Olympics
Female United States Army officers
21st-century American women
Military personnel from Colorado